Phil or Philip Andrews may refer to:

 Phil Andrews (racing driver) (born 1966), British racing driver
 Phil Andrews (footballer) (born 1976), English footballer
 Phil Andrews (politician) (born 1959), member of Montgomery County Council, Maryland
 Philip Andrews (economist) (1914–1971), British industrial economist
 Philip Andrews (admiral), United States Navy officer